Micklebring is a small village in the civil parish of Braithwell, South Yorkshire, to the south-west of Doncaster.

Coronation Street star Bill Waddington (Percy Sugden) was a former resident.

The Plough Inn is in Micklebring.

See also
Listed buildings in Braithwell

References

External links

Villages in South Yorkshire